Sir Reginald Stourton of Stourton, Wiltshire (born 1434) was an English knight.

Life
He was the second son of John Stourton, 1st Baron Stourton and Margery or Marjory Wadham.

He was knighted and became High Sheriff of Wiltshire in 1455–1456 and 1462–1463.

1434 births
Year of death unknown
15th-century English people
High Sheriffs of Wiltshire
Younger sons of barons